The year 1971 was the 190th year of the Rattanakosin Kingdom of Thailand. It was the 26th year in the reign of King Bhumibol Adulyadej (Rama IX), and is reckoned as year 2514 in the Buddhist Era.

Incumbents
King: Bhumibol Adulyadej 
Crown Prince: (vacant)
Prime Minister:  Thanom Kittikachorn
Supreme Patriarch: 
until 18 December: Ariyavangsagatayana V

 
Years of the 20th century in Thailand
Thailand
Thailand
1970s in Thailand